Frontier is a restaurant in West Town, Chicago, Illinois, United States. It adopts a cosy setting and serves finger food as well as novelty food, such as cooked alligator meat. Frontier is run by chef Brian Jupiter and owned by Mark Domitrovich.

Description
Frontier is located at Noble Square in West Town, Chicago. It is run by chef Brian Jupiter, who hails from New Orleans, Louisiana. Frontier is proprieted by Mark Domitrovich. The restaurant adopts a cosy setting.

Menu
Frontier offers an array of finger food and novelty food. It serves alligator on its menu. One alligator dish comprises a smoked whole alligator filled with whole chickens and other side items, and costs some few hundred dollars. Alligator ribs are also available. The restaurant also carries other smoked meat dishes, including pig and wild boar. After cooking, the whole animal dish is brought to a designated table to be divided into smaller pieces. Alcoholic drinks and oyster dishes are sold at Frontier too.

References

External links
 

Restaurants in Chicago